Night Lights is an album by saxophonist Gene Ammons recorded in 1970 and released on the Prestige label.

Reception
AllMusic awarded the album 3 stars with its review by Scott Yanow stating, "One of his first recording sessions after he returned to the scene following a rather severe jail sentence was this tribute to Nat King Cole... was quickly forgotten as Ammons recorded some more commercial material and this set was not released for the first time until 1985. Ammons is in excellent form".

Track listing
 "Lush Life" (Billy Strayhorn) – 5:58
 "The Christmas Song" (Mel Tormé, Robert Wells) – 5:57
 "Nature Boy" (Eden Ahbez) – 8:14
 "Night Lights" (Chester Conn, Sammy Gallop) – 5:22
 "Sweet Lorraine" (Cliff Burwell, Mitchell Parish)
 "Calypso Blues" (Nat King Cole, Don George) – 5:41

Personnel
Gene Ammons – tenor saxophone
Wynton Kelly – piano
George Duvivier – bass
Rudy Collins – drums
Pucho – congas (track 6)

References

Gene Ammons albums
1985 albums
Prestige Records albums
Albums recorded at Van Gelder Studio